Bissula (flourished in 4th century AD) was an Alemannic woman in the 4th century. She was captured by the Romans in 368 at a young age, and became a slave of the Roman poet Ausonius. Ausonius fell deeply in love with Bissula, and released her from slavery. He wrote a poem on her, de Bissula ("About Bissula"), which he sent to his friend Paulus.

Sources
 Latin text of beginning of the main part. Click on Next for the next part.
 Liebesgedichte an Bissula, a German translation by M. W. Besser, 1908
 Friedrich Marx: Ausonius 3. In: Paulys Realencyclopädie der classischen Altertumswissenschaft (RE). Band II,2, Stuttgart 1896, Sp. 2562–2580, hier Sp. 2564 und Sp. 2571.
 Felix Dahn: Gesammelte Werke. Erste Serie, Band 3. Berlin 1884.

4th-century Germanic people
Alemannic women
Imperial Roman slaves and freedmen
4th-century women